In astronomy, the new moon is the first lunar phase, when the Moon and Sun have the same ecliptic longitude. At this phase, the lunar disk is not visible to the naked eye, except when it is silhouetted against the Sun during a solar eclipse.

The original meaning of the term 'new moon', which is still sometimes used in calendrical, non-astronomical contexts, is the first visible crescent of the Moon after conjunction with the Sun. This thin waxing crescent is briefly and faintly visible as the Moon gets lower in the western sky after sunset. The precise time and even the date of the appearance of the new moon by this definition will be influenced by the geographical location of the observer. The first crescent marks the beginning of the month in the Islamic calendar and in some lunisolar calendars such as the Hebrew calendar. In the Chinese calendar, the beginning of the month is marked by the last visible crescent of a waning Moon.

The astronomical new moon occurs by definition at the moment of conjunction in ecliptical longitude with the Sun when the Moon is invisible from the Earth. This moment is unique and does not depend on location, and in certain circumstances, it coincides with a solar eclipse.

A lunation, or synodic month, is the time period from one new moon to the next. At the J2000.0 epoch, the average length of a lunation is 29.53059 days (or 29 days, 12 hours, 44 minutes, and 3 seconds). However, the length of any one synodic month can vary from 29.26 to 29.80 days (12.96 hours) due to the perturbing effects of the Sun's gravity on the Moon's eccentric orbit.

Lunation number 

The Lunation Number or Lunation Cycle is a number given to each lunation beginning from a certain one in history. Several conventions are in use.

The most commonly used was the Brown Lunation Number (BLN), which defines lunation 1 as beginning at the first new moon of 1923, the year when Ernest William Brown's lunar theory was introduced in the American Ephemeris and Nautical Almanac. Lunation 1 occurred at approximately 02:41 UTC, January 17, 1923. With later refinements, the BLN was used in almanacs until 1983.

A more recent lunation number (simply called the Lunation Number) was introduced by Jean Meeus in 1998. defines lunation 0 as beginning on the first new moon of 2000 (this occurred at approximately 18:14 UTC, January 6, 2000).  The formula relating Meeus's Lunation Number with the Brown Lunation Number is: BLN = LN + 953.

The Goldstine Lunation Number refers to the lunation numbering used by Herman Goldstine, with lunation 0 beginning on January 11, 1001 BCE, and can be calculated using GLN = LN + 37105.

The Hebrew Lunation Number is the count of lunations in the Hebrew calendar with lunation 1 beginning on October 6, 3761 BCE. It can be calculated using HLN = LN + 71234.

The Islamic Lunation Number is the count of lunations in the Islamic Calendar with lunation 1 as beginning on the first day of the month of Muharram, which occurred in 622 CE (July 15, Julian, in the proleptic reckoning).  It can be calculated using ILN = LN + 17038.

The Thai Lunation Number is called "มาสเกณฑ์" (Maasa-Kendha), defines lunation 0 as the beginning of Burmese era of the Buddhist calendar on Sunday, March 22, 638 CE.  It can be calculated using TLN = LN + 16843.

Lunisolar calendars

Hebrew calendar
The new moon, in Hebrew Rosh Chodesh, signifies the start of every Hebrew month and is considered an important date and minor holiday in the Hebrew calendar. The modern form of the calendar practiced in Judaism is a rule-based lunisolar calendar, akin to the Chinese calendar, measuring months defined in lunar cycles as well as years measured in solar cycles, and distinct from the purely lunar Islamic calendar and the predominantly solar Gregorian calendar. The Jewish months are fixed to the annual seasons by setting the new moon of Aviv, the barley ripening, or spring, as the first moon and head of the year.  Since the Babylonian captivity, this month is called Nisan, and it is calculated based on mathematical rules designed to ensure that festivals are observed in their traditional season. Passover always falls in the springtime. This fixed lunisolar calendar follows rules introduced by Hillel II and refined until the ninth century  This calculation makes use of a mean lunation length used by Ptolemy and handed down from Babylonians, which is still very accurate: ca. 29.530594 days vs. a present value (see below) of 29.530589 days.  This difference of only 0.000005, or five-millionths of a day, adds up to about only four hours since Babylonian times.

The messianic Pentecostal group, the New Israelites of Peru, keeps the new moon as a Sabbath of rest. As an evangelical church, it follows the Bible's teachings that God sanctified the seventh-day Sabbath, and the new moons in addition to it. No work may be done from dusk until dusk, and the services run for 11 hours, although a large number spend 24 hours within the gates of the temples, sleeping and singing praises throughout the night.

Chinese calendar

The new moon is the beginning of the month in the Chinese calendar. Some Buddhist Chinese keep a vegetarian diet on the new moon and full moon each month.

Hindu calendar 

The new moon is significant in the lunar Hindu calendar. The first day of the calendar starts the day after the dark moon phase (Amavasya).

There are fifteen moon dates for each of the waxing and waning periods. These fifteen dates are divided evenly into five categories: Nanda, Bhadra', Jaya, Rikta, and Purna, which are cycled through in that order.
Nanda dates are considered to be favorable for auspicious works; Bhadra dates for works related to community, social, family, and friends; and Jaya dates for dealing with conflict. Rikta dates are considered beneficial only for works related to cruelty. Purna dates are considered to be favorable for all work.

Babylonian calendar

Lunar calendars

Islamic calendar

The lunar Hijri calendar has exactly 12 lunar months in a year of 354 or 355 days. It has retained an observational definition of the new moon, marking the new month when the first crescent moon is seen, and making it impossible to be certain in advance of when a specific month will begin (in particular, the exact date on which the month of Ramadan will begin is not known in advance). In Saudi Arabia, the new King Abdullah Centre for Crescent Observations and Astronomy in Mecca has a clock for addressing this as an international scientific project.  In Pakistan, there is a "Central Ruet-e-Hilal Committee" whose head is Mufti Muneeb-ur-Rehman, assisted by 150 observatories of the Pakistan Meteorological Department, which announces the sighting of the new moon.

An attempt to unify Muslims on a scientifically calculated worldwide calendar was adopted by both the Fiqh Council of North America and the European Council for Fatwa and Research in 2007. The new calculation requires that conjunction must occur before sunset in Mecca, Saudi Arabia, and that, on the same evening, moonset must take place after sunset. These can be precisely calculated and therefore a unified calendar is possible should it become adopted worldwide.

Solar calendars holding moveable feasts

Baháʼí calendar

The Baháʼí calendar is a solar calendar with certain new moons observed as moveable feasts.
In the Baháʼí Faith, effective from 2015 onwards, the "Twin Holy Birthdays", refer to two successive holy days in the Baháʼí calendar (the birth of the Báb and the birth of Bahá'u'lláh), will be observed on the first and the second day following the occurrence of the eighth new moon after Naw-Rúz (Baháʼí New Year), as determined in advance by astronomical tables using Tehran as the point of reference. This will result in the observance of the Twin Birthdays moving, year to year, from mid-October to mid-November according to the Gregorian calendar.

Christian liturgical calendar
Easter, the most important feast in the Christian liturgical calendar, is a movable feast. The date of Easter is determined by reference to the ecclesiastical full moon, which, being historically difficult to determine with precision, is defined as being fourteen days after the (first crescent) new moon.

See also 

 Black moon
 Blue moon
 Dark moon
 Hebrew calendar
 Hilal
 Islamic New Year
 Islamic or Hejri calendar
 Lilith (hypothetical moon)
 Lunar calendar
 Lunar phase
 Lunisolar calendar
 Occultation#Occultations by the Moon
 Solar eclipse
 Wet moon

Notes

References

Works cited

External links 
 Moon Watch site  of the Nautical Almanac Office

 
Phases of the Moon